Aileen Crowley (born 12 February 1994) is an Irish rower. She competed for Ireland alongside Monika Dukarska in the women's coxless pair event at the 2020 Summer Olympics.

References

External links
 
 Aileen Crowley at Rowing Ireland
 
 

1994 births
Living people
Irish female rowers
Olympic rowers of Ireland
Rowers at the 2020 Summer Olympics
Sportspeople from County Kerry